The smooth-headed catfish (Plicofollis nella), also known as the shieldhead catfish, is a species of catfish in the family Ariidae. It was described by Achille Valenciennes in 1840, originally under the genus Pimelodus. It inhabits marine and brackish waters in New Guinea, Australia, and southern and southeastern Asia.

References

Ariidae
Fish described in 1840